Francesco Minorello or Menorelo (1624- 26 September, 1657) was an Italian painter of the Baroque period active mainly in Padua.

Biography
He was born in Conselve, but trained with Luca da Reggio, along with Giulio Cirello who also practiced in Padua. He was from the same family that produced two lesser artists Giovanni Battista and Orsola Minorello.

Francesco died young. He painted two canvases, St Agnes at the Gallows and St Agnes refusing Gifts, for the church of Sant 'Agnese in Padua and a Mission of the Apostles for the church of Santa Maria della Consolazione in Este.

References

1624 births
1657 deaths
17th-century Italian painters
Italian male painters
Painters from Padua
Italian Baroque painters